Ramshackle was an electronic dub group that released two albums and collaborated with such artists as Steve Winwood, Jah Wobble, and Maxi Jazz.  They released two albums, "Depthology" and "Chin on the Kerb" in the 1990s and a remixed version of their song, "Eyes, Lips, Body" was included on the Hackers soundtrack.

Line-up

Former members
 Ben Chapman: Beats, Production
 Steve Roberts: Vocals, Piano
 Johnson Somerset: Synths, Production

Guest musicians
 Jah Wobble − Bass on Isn't This The Life
 Steve Winwood - Clavinet on Pulse
 Maxi Jazz - Scratching on the Depthology album
 Juan Wells - Vocals on Wannabe
 Val Harrison - Vocals on Wannabe
 Mike McEvoy - Guitar on the Depthology album, Piano on Prayers for the Lonely and Young and Strong
 Luke Brighty - Guitar on Wannabe
 Robin Key - Guitar on Wannabe and Bitter Lies
 Brendan Beale - Piano and Strings on Let Love Reign and Echoes in Red
 Ian Dutt - Loops (some)

Discography

Studio albums
 Depthology (1995)
 Chin on the Kerb (1997)

References

External links
 

Electronic music groups
Musical groups established in 1995